Benny Mattsson (born May 8, 1978) is a Swedish footballer playing for Ånge IF. He has previously played for Ljunga IF, Fränsta IK, Stockviks FF, Selånger FK, IFK Sundsvall, Gefle IF and GIF Sundsvall. He is 5' 10" tall and plays as a striker.

External links
 
 
 

1978 births
Living people
Swedish footballers
Gefle IF players
GIF Sundsvall players
Association football forwards
Place of birth missing (living people)